Declan Chisholm (born January 12, 2000) is a Canadian professional ice hockey defenceman for the Manitoba Moose of the American Hockey League (AHL) as a prospect to the Winnipeg Jets of the National Hockey League. The Jets selected him in the fifth round, 150th overall, of the 2018 NHL Entry Draft.

Early life 
Chisholm was born on January 12, 2000, in Bowmanville, Ontario, to Paul Chisholm and Erin Fagan. As a young child, he battled a staphylococcal infection in his knee that required surgery; after spending some time using a walker, Chisholm joined a local youth ice hockey team, where he was placed on defence.

Playing career

Junior 
The Peterborough Petes of the Ontario Hockey League (OHL) selected Chisholm in the second round, 24th overall, of the 2016 OHL Priority Selection. He spent four years in the OHL; during his final season, he set career highs with 13 goals, 56 assists, and 69 points, the most of any Peterborough defenceman.

Professional 
The Winnipeg Jets of the National Hockey League (NHL) selected Chisholm in the fifth round, 150th overall, of the 2018 NHL Entry Draft, and he signed a three-year, entry-level contract with the team on June 1, 2020. He made his professional hockey debut on February 22, 2021, playing for the Manitoba Moose, Winnipeg's American Hockey League (AHL) affiliate. With the Jets' roster depleted by COVID-19 issues throughout the team, Chisholm was called up to make his NHL debut on January 13, 2022, the day after his 22nd birthday. Chisholm, who had six goals and 14 points with Manitoba at the time of his call-up, was partnered with Nate Schmidt for Winnipeg's 3–0 shutout win over the Detroit Red Wings.

Personal life 
Chisholm is the grandson of Paddy Fagan, a lifelong hurling player in Ireland before he immigrated to Canada.

Career statistics

References

External links 
 

Living people
2000 births
Canadian ice hockey defencemen
Ice hockey people from Ontario
Manitoba Moose players
Peterborough Petes (ice hockey) players
Winnipeg Jets draft picks
Winnipeg Jets players
Ice hockey players at the 2016 Winter Youth Olympics